Zoricic or Zoričić is a surname. Notable people with the surname include:

 Milovan Zoričić (1884–1971), Croatian football official and criminal judge
 Milovan Zoričić (statistician) (1850–1912), Croatian statistician
 Nick Zoricic (1983–2012), Canadian ski cross skier